Bankhad is an administrative unit, known as Union council of Kohistan District in the Khyber Pakhtunkhwa province of Pakistan.

District Kohistan has 4 Tehsils i.e. Dassu, Pattan, Palas and Kandia. Each Tehsil comprises a certain number of Union councils. There are 38 Union councils in district Kohistan.

See also 

 Kohistan District, Pakistan

External links
Khyber-Pakhtunkhwa Government website section on Lower Dir
United Nations
 HAJJ website Uploads
 PBS paiman.jsi.com 

Kohistan District, Pakistan
Populated places in Kohistan District, Pakistan
Union councils of Khyber Pakhtunkhwa
Union Councils of Kohistan District, Pakistan